Belogorye is a rural locality (a station) in urban okrug Blagoveshchensk of Amur Oblast, Russia. The population was 27 as of 2018.

Geography 
The village is located near the right bank of the Zeya River, 10 km north-east from Blagoveshchensk.

References 

Rural localities in Blagoveshchensk urban okrug
Blagoveshchensk